Levan Ramishvili (28 March 1973) is a key figure in Georgia's democracy movement, which successfully forced authoritarian Eduard Shevardnadze to resign through strategic nonviolent action. Since 1996 he is one of the founders and director of the Georgian human rights and public interest advocacy organization, the Liberty Institute.

He was actively involved in trainings for civil activists, and in 2003, trained Kmara activists in nonviolent campaigning techniques. He is author of the country’s Freedom of Information Law, the law on Freedom of Speech and Expression, law on Broadcasting, student's rights and academic freedom chapter in laws on General Education and Higher Education.
 
He is a long-time civil liberties activist, and became involved in civil liberties battles in 1991 as an active member of the student movement for Georgia's Liberation. Later in 1992 he was actively campaigning against the nationalist government of Zviad Gamsakhurdia. 
 
In 1992 he got involved with the Center of Social Management at the Cabinet of Ministries. In 1994 he was appointed as a chair of the division of sociology at the International Center for Federal Development of Georgia. He was actively engaged in journalistic work working as a co-editor for newspaper Mimomkhilveli in 1992, co-editor with newspapers: Business Courier (international politics, world economy) 1994 and Argumenti (International reporting, letters to editor) 1995 and 1996. In 1996 and 1997 he worked as a political analyst with the independent TV Channel Rustavi 2.

From 2009 he is editor of world section in Magazine "Tabula".

External links 
Hugh Pope, The Wall Street Journal: Pro-West leaders in Georgia push Shevardnadze out
Giga Bokeria, Givi Targamadze, Levan Ramishvili: Georgian Media in the 90s: A step to liberty, 1997 (PDF file)

Politicians from Georgia (country)
1973 births
Living people